Christopher James Wildeman (born October 26, 1979) is an American sociologist and professor of policy analysis and management in the College of Human Ecology at Cornell University. He is also Director of the Bronfenbrenner Center for Translational Research and Associate Vice Provost for the Social Sciences at Cornell University. Wildeman is known for researching the effects of incarceration on children's health, homelessness, and racial inequality.

Biography
Wildeman was educated at Dickinson College (B.A. in Philosophy, Sociology, and Spanish, 2002) and Princeton University (M.A., 2006; Ph.D., 2008). Both of his graduate degrees were in sociology and demography, and his Ph.D. was supervised by Sara McLanahan, Bruce Western, and Devah Pager. For two years (2008–2010), he was a postdoctoral affiliate at the University of Michigan's Population Studies Center, after which he joined the faculty of Yale University as an assistant professor of sociology. In 2013, he became an associate professor at Yale, and in 2014, he joined the faculty of Cornell as an associate professor. Since 2016, he has also been a research affiliate at the University of Wisconsin, Madison's Institute for Research on Poverty. He is Director of the Bronfenbrenner Center for Translational Research and Associate Vice Provost for the Social Sciences at Cornell University.

Selected publications

References

External links

Living people
1979 births
American sociologists
Cornell University faculty
Dickinson College alumni
Princeton University alumni